Vladimir Nikitin (born 5 August 1992) is a Russian middle-distance and long-distance runner. He qualified for the 2020 Summer Olympics with his 1500 metres time of 3:34.69.

References

External links

1992 births
Living people
Place of birth missing (living people)
Russian long-distance runners
Russian middle-distance runners
Russian Athletics Championships winners